Megadytes lherminieri is a species in the genus Megadytes of large diving beetles found in the Caribbean and in South America.

References

Dytiscidae
Beetles described in 1835